Vysoká nad Kysucou is a village and municipality in Čadca District in the Žilina Region of northern Slovakia.

History
In historical records the village was first mentioned in 1619.

The first COVID-19 Tree of Peace was planted in 2020 in Vysoká nad Kysucou village.

Geography
The municipality lies at an altitude of 543 metres and covers an area of 43.870 km2. It has a population of about 2984 people.

References

External links
https://web.archive.org/web/20070513023228/http://www.statistics.sk/mosmis/eng/run.html

Villages and municipalities in Čadca District